Vrh is a settlement in the hills northwest of Šmarje pri Jelšah in eastern Slovenia. The entire Municipality of Šmarje pri Jelšah lies in the traditional region of Styria and is now included in the Savinja Statistical Region.

References

External links
Vrh at Geopedia

Populated places in the Municipality of Šmarje pri Jelšah